Sheet One is the second studio album by Canadian electronic music producer Richie Hawtin, and his debut studio album under the alias Plastikman. It was released in 1993 by Novamute Records.

Artwork
The front inlay of Sheet One was perforated, giving it the look of a wall of LSD tabs. The cover was so realistic that a man in Texas was arrested when a police officer saw the CD on his car seat after pulling him over on a traffic violation in 1994.

Critical reception

In 2006, Sheet One was ranked at number 74 on XLR8Rs "Top 100 Albums" list. In 2015, Thump placed it at number 15 on its list of the "99 Greatest Dance Albums of All Time". In 2017, Mixmag listed it as one of the 10 best 1990s techno albums.

Track listing

Personnel
Credits adapted from liner notes.
 Richie Hawtin – music, layout
 Dominic Ayre – logo design

References

External links
 

1993 albums
Richie Hawtin albums
Novamute Records albums